Adil-Giray Temryukovich Atazhukin (died 1807), the son of Temryuko (referred to in Russian documents as Адиль-Гирей Аджи Темрюков Adil-Girey Adzhi Temryukov) a Circassian of the Kabardian noble family. He held the Russian rank of Premier Major in 1794. He was a member of the anti-colonial sociopolitical events took place in Kabarda in the late 18th century.

His brother, Ismail Bey Atazhukin, was the prototype of the hero of the Mikhail Lermontov's poem "Ismail Bey".

In 1787, as part of the Kabardian national militia, he took part in the Russo-Turkish War of 1787-1792 in Kuban.  Adil Giray became one of the leaders of the resistance to the introduction of the Kabardian tribal courts and executions, acting on the basis of Russian law, in conjunction with other actions violating the rights Kabardins.

In 1795, he and his brother Ismail Bey and the prince Atahuko Hamurzin were expelled from Kabarda in Ekaterinoslav province. In 1798,he fled from exile back to Kabarda and headed the anti-colonial movement giving it a religious content. In 1799, an active policy of Atazhuko allowed to abolish courts and tribal violence in Kabarda.

He also made a pilgrimage to Mecca.

He studied Arabic and Tatar "literacy."

He was married and had 5 sons: Kasai, Ismael, Kazy, Mohammed, Zayuskhan.

He died in 1807 during an epidemic of plague.

References

Year of birth missing
1807 deaths
Kabardino-Balkaria
Circassian nobility
Circassian people of Russia
Circassians
North Caucasian independence activists